Middletown is a village in Logan County, Illinois, United States. The population was 324 at the 2010 census, down from 434 in 2000.

Geography

History

Middletown, founded in 1832, is the oldest town in Logan County.  At one time, Middletown was considered as a location for the capital of Illinois. Middletown was a frequent overnight stop for legislators traveling between Springfield and Peoria in the mid-to-late 19th century.  The Stage Coach Inn, located off the town square, is the oldest such wooden structure in Illinois.  It is believed that Abraham Lincoln stayed at the Inn.  Unfortunately, official records were destroyed in a fire many years ago.

The town does have at least one official and verified link to Abe Lincoln as he surveyed the site which would become the town during his early days surveying in Logan County.

Middletown is also home to the Knapp library and museum.  The Knapp building is the oldest brick building in Logan county.

Several hot air balloon records were set in Middletown and the historic Vin Fiz, the first cross country flight, counts Middletown as one of the stops on that journey.

Middletown celebrated its Terquasquicentennial (175th birthday) during June 2007.

Demographics

As of the census of 2000, there were 434 people, 162 households, and 110 families residing in the village. The racial makeup of the village was 97.00% White, 0.23% African American, 0.46% Native American, 1.15% from other races, and 1.15% from two or more races. Hispanic or Latino of any race were 1.38% of the population.

There were 162 households, out of which 40.7% had children under the age of 18 living with them, 51.2% were married couples living together, 13.0% had a female householder with no husband present, and 31.5% were non-families. 28.4% of all households were made up of individuals, and 13.0% had someone living alone who was 65 years of age or older. The average household size was 2.68 and the average family size was 3.30.

In the village, the population was spread out, with 30.9% under the age of 18, 8.1% from 18 to 24, 29.5% from 25 to 44, 19.6% from 45 to 64, and 12.0% who were 65 years of age or older. The median age was 34 years. For every 100 females, there were 93.8 males. For every 100 females age 18 and over, there were 85.2 males.

The median income for a household in the village was $33,929, and the median income for a family was $44,375. Males had a median income of $33,125 versus $21,875 for females. The per capita income for the village was $14,478. About 11.1% of families and 16.1% of the population were below the poverty line, including 28.1% of those under age 18 and 4.8% of those age 65 or over.

Education
New Holland-Middletown Elementary School District 88 operates the primary and middle school for the community. The high school for students assigned to District 88 schools is Lincoln Community High School.

References

Villages in Logan County, Illinois
Villages in Illinois
Populated places established in 1832
1832 establishments in Illinois